Hippocephala lineaticollis is a species of beetle in the family Cerambycidae. It was described by Pic in 1924.

References

Agapanthiini
Beetles described in 1924
Taxa named by Maurice Pic